Continental drip is the observation that southward-pointing landforms are more numerous and prominent than northward-pointing landforms. For example, Africa, South America, the Indian subcontinent, etc. all taper off to a point towards the south. The name is a play on continental drift. When published, it has been geological satire.

The observation was made by Ormonde de Kay in a 1973 tongue-in-cheek paper, which he introduced as "another earth-shaking new theory derived from simply looking at maps." It satirizes the acceptance of plate tectonics theory as it was being formulated and refined at the time to describe the movement of the Earth's continents that is now thoroughly accepted. Given examples of smaller-than-continental drips include Baja California, Florida, all of Europe's peninsulas except Jutland (Italy, Greece, Spain, Scandinavia, Crimea) as well as in southeast Asia, the Malay Peninsula and Indochina.

John C. Holden expanded and illustrated his own version of the idea in 1976, almost entirely as a parody in the Journal of Irreproducible Results. In Holden's expansion of the concept, he satirically invents the fictional German words Sudpolarfluchtkraft ("south polar fleeing force") having created Sudpolarfluchttrofeln ("south polar fleeing drips"). He does, however, cite an actual theory of northward drift of Gondwanaland descendant continents of Australia, Africa, South America, and India breaking away from Antarctica, which he authored with Robert S. Dietz in 1970. As part of the 1976 parody paper, he proposes that the "drips" or "sub-drips" are North America, Greenland, South America, Africa, Arabia, India, Asia, and Australia. Contrarily, "anti-drips" are formed by Ceylon and Antarctica itself because Antarctica is "on top of the world" as all the continents draw away from it.

The planet simulator (software toy) SimEarth by Maxis includes continental drip in its Terran (Earth) simulations.

See also 

 Land and water hemispheres
 South up map orientation

References

External links

Plate tectonics
Humour in science
In-jokes